Michael Alan O'Neill (30 December 1970 – 6 June 2018) was an Irish actor best known for his roles as Hugh in Sons of Anarchy and as Keith McGrath in the Irish soap Fair City.
O’Neill was found dead in a friend’s apartment in Burbank, California USA, after suffering a fall and subsequently, what was later determined blunt force trauma to the head. No suspicious circumstances were suspected and his death was ruled accidental.

Death
O'Neill was found dead by a friend in his apartment in Burbank, Los Angeles, California. The cause of death was blunt force trauma to the head, and was later ruled accidental.

Filmography

Film

Television

References

External links

1971 births
2018 deaths
21st-century Irish male actors
Irish male film actors
Irish male television actors
Male actors from Dublin (city)